Helen Page Camp (December 27, 1930 – August 1, 1991) was an American actress.

Early years
Born to Austin and Helen (née Landes) Camp in Washington, D.C., Camp's career began onstage, most notably Off Broadway in New York City.

Career
Her first known or credited screen appearance in film or television came in 1968, when she was 37 years old, as "Lucy" on Here Come the Brides.

Film
In 1971, she was in the movie Cold Turkey as Mrs. Watson.

Television
Later, she made guest appearances on popular shows such as The Wild Wild West, Maude (six different roles; most notably with James Coco as the swinging married couple "Channing and Hortence McGrath"), All in the Family, Cheers, Gimme a Break!, Thirtysomething and Newhart.

In early 1976, the characters of Laverne De Fazio (Penny Marshall) and Shirley Feeney (Cindy Williams) from Happy Days were spun off into an equally successful eponymous sitcom, Laverne & Shirley, and Camp was cast in two episodes as the girls' landlady, Mrs. Havenwurst, but the role was short-lived. In the fall of 1976, actress Betty Garrett permanently replaced her as Laverne and Shirley's new landlady, Mrs. Babish.

Camp portrayed Tanya Terwilliger on The Tony Randall Show (1976-1978), Millie Capestro on 13 Queens Boulevard (1979), and the title character's mother on Richie Brockelman, Private Eye (1978),

In 1990, Camp assumed the role of Margaret Furth on The Fresh Prince of Bel-Air.

Death
Camp died in Los Angeles, California of a stroke on August 1, 1991, at the age of 60.

Filmography
A partial list of roles in both film and television follows:

References

External links
 
 Helen Page Camp at Rotten Tomatoes

1930 births
1991 deaths
Actresses from Washington, D.C.
American film actresses
American stage actresses
American television actresses
20th-century American actresses